HD 37124 d is an extrasolar planet approximately 103 light-years away in the constellation of Taurus.  The planet was discovered in 2005 orbiting the star HD 37124 in a long-period orbit.  Based on its mass, it is considered to be a gas giant.  An alternative solution to the radial velocities gives a period of 29.92 days and a minimum mass 17% that of Jupiter.

References

External links
 
 

Taurus (constellation)
Exoplanets discovered in 2005
Giant planets
Exoplanets detected by radial velocity
Giant planets in the habitable zone

es:HD 37124#Sistema planetario
it:HD 37124#Prospetto